Elisa Toffoli  (born 19 December 1977), performing under the mononym Elisa, is an Italian singer-songwriter. She is one of few Italian musicians to write and record mainly in English. She draws inspiration from many genres such as pop, alternative rock, electronica and trip hop. In Europe she is perhaps most recognised for the single "Come Speak to Me", while American audiences may recognise the song "Dancing" as featured in both the 2006 and 2007 seasons of So You Think You Can Dance. On 18 December 2012, her collaboration with Ennio Morricone, "Ancora qui", was featured on Quentin Tarantino's film, Django Unchained and its soundtrack album, which was nominated for a Grammy Award for Best Compilation Soundtrack for Visual Media.

She has released nine studio albums, five compilations, two live albums, eight video album and 51 singles, selling over 5,5 million copies in Italy, certified by M&D and FIMI with a diamond disc, a multiplatinum disc, 25 platinum and four gold certifications.

She earned six awards at the Sanremo Music Festival in 2001, one Targa Tenco, two Lunezia Awards, 13 Italian, Wind & Music Awards, one award at the Festivalbar, one Nastro d'argento, and several other awards, including an MTV Europe Music Award.

Early life 
Elisa Toffoli was born on 19 December 1977, in Trieste in north-eastern Italy. She grew up in Monfalcone (27 km from Trieste, 17 km from Gorizia, 5 km from Slovenia, 80 km from Austria). Living in a border-area, where she had the opportunity to listen to different languages and experience various cultures, was important for Elisa's later inspirations and helped her develop a high aptitude to sing in multiple languages. 
Her early influences include Björk, PJ Harvey, Tori Amos, Aretha Franklin and Ella Fitzgerald, while she has credited Rudyard Kipling and Jim Morrison of The Doors as lyrical inspirators. She began writing songs at the age of 11 and later played in several local bands. At 15 she appeared in a karaoke TV program, Karaoke hosted by Rosario Fiorello.

Career

2000s 

At 16, Elisa met Caterina Caselli, who one year later signed her to the record company Sugar. At 18 she left for Berkeley, California (US) to work on songs for her debut album with record producer Corrado Rustici, who has also worked with Whitney Houston, Aretha Franklin and Zucchero among others.

Elisa's first single "Sleeping in Your Hand" was released in late May 1997, followed by her debut album Pipes & Flowers on 22 September. She was credited as a writer or co-writer on all tracks. The album soon went quadruple platinum in Italy and won her two prizes: Targa Tenco and PIM (Premio Italiano della Musica). She was also a special guest on Eros Ramazzotti's European tour. In 1998, the re-release of Pipes and Flowers included a new track, Cure Me, recorded in Venice with British producer Darren Allison (Spiritualized, Belle and Sebastian).

5 May 2000 saw the release of Asile's World (Asile being Elisa written backwards). The album took a new turn in terms of musical influences and featured songs produced by Howie B, Roberto Vernetti, Mauro Malavasi and Leo Z.

In September 2000 Elisa recorded her first song in Italian, "Luce (Tramonti a nord est)". The song was initially written in English, but an Italian lyric was written in collaboration with fellow singer Zucchero. The song was performed at the 2001 Sanremo Festival supported by the Solis String Quartet, and won her the Critics' Award, Interpreter of the Year as well as the competition altogether. Both Italian and English versions were later included in a re-release of Asile's World. In November she was awarded three prizes at the Italian Music Awards: Best female artist, Best single (Luce) and Best song, as well as taking home the Best Italian Artist at the MTV Europe Music Awards 2001 in Frankfurt. She also received Premio Italiano della Musica's Best Female Artist and Best Single (Luce).

Elisa's third album, Then Comes the Sun was released on 9 November 2001, with Rustici returning as producer. The album saw a return to a more pop/rock sound and went triple platinum. The following year she performed both at the closing of the 2002 Winter Olympics in Salt Lake City, Utah singing a jazzy version of the Italian national hymn, and at the 2002 Pavarotti and Friends concert, singing Voglio vivere così (col sole in fronte) with the world-famous tenor.

In August 2002 Sugar released an International album simply entitled Elisa. The album is a selection of songs from her first three albums fronted by  Come Speak to Me, the original English version of her hit Luce. The single received high rotation on MTV Europe as well as fair airplay and moderate attention in several European countries, but still failed to establish Elisa as an international artist.

In late 2003 Elisa released the album Lotus, an acoustic album featuring new, stripped-down versions of some of her songs as well as a handful of new ones including a cover version of Leonard Cohen's "Hallelujah". The album was followed by an extensive acoustic Italian tour as well as a double DVD set consisting of an MTV Supersonic concert and The making of Lotus.

Elisa's fourth studio album Pearl Days was released on 15 October 2004. All tracks were produced by Glen Ballard, known for producing Alanis Morissette's Jagged Little Pill and tracks for artists such as Anastacia, Michael Jackson, Shakira, Christina Aguilera and The Corrs. The album was more rock-influenced and sported more electric guitars than her earlier records. One of the songs, Life Goes On, was later translated to Italian (Una poesia anche per te) and became the fourth best selling single in Italy in 2005. The single was accompanied by a self-directed video which won the Premio Video Italiano for Best Female Artist. In the summer of 2005, Elisa appeared at the Live 8 concert in Rome alongside Zucchero, Luciano Ligabue and other major Italian artists.Two non-album singles were released in 2005 and 2006, Swan and Teach Me Again (duet with Tina Turner). Both supported major Italian films, namely Melissa P. and All the Invisible Children (Segment 9: Song Song & Little Cat directed by John Woo). Elisa also performed Luce (Tramonti a nord est) at the closing ceremony of the Winter Olympics in Torino.
On 17 November 2006 Soundtrack '96-'06 was released, a collection of hits through her first ten years as a recording artist. The album also contained four new songs; three in Italian and one in English. The album peaked at number 1, was certified diamond and became the third most selling album of 2006 in Italy with more than of 700,000 copies. A revised edition entitled Caterpillar was released in September 2007, aimed at the International market. Several of the songs had been remixed, rearranged and partly rerecorded and it featured an entirely new cover version of The Rolling Stones Wild Horses. The box set Soundtrack Live '96-'06 was released on 23 November 2007, containing a CD and DVD from a Milan concert during the Soundtrack Live Tour 2007.

In the wake of Elisa's increased popularity due to her song Dancing appearing on So You Think You Can Dance, yet another compilation album appropriately named Dancing was released in the US on 15 July 2008. Being the singer's first album to be available in the US, it is recognised as her American debut.

Elisa released her next album, Heart, on 13 November 2009. The first single was Ti vorrei sollevare with Giuliano Sangiorgi from Italian rock band Negramaro. The album also contains a collaboration with Antony Hegarty from Antony and the Johnsons in the song "Forgiveness".

2010s 

On 30 November 2010, Elisa released Ivy, an album in the same vein as Lotus, featuring 3 new tracks, acoustic versions of her past songs and covers such as Smashing Pumpkins' "1979". The album sold over 80.000 copies in Italy and was further supported by a tour.

In 2012, the song "Love Is Requited", written by Andrea Guerra and Michele von Buren for the soundtrack of Roberto Faenza's film Someday This Pain Will Be Useful to You and performed by Elisa, received a Nastro d'Argento for Best Original Song. On 18 December 2012, her collaboration with Ennio Morricone, "Ancora qui", was featured on Quentin Tarantino's film, Django Unchained and its soundtrack album.

On 15 October 2013, L'anima vola, Elisa's first album recorded entirely in Italian was released. In early August, the album was certified double platinum by the Federation of the Italian Music Industry. Elisa was featured on a special version of "We Are Incurable Romantics" by Belgian singer Ozark Henry, which was released in the Italian iTunes store on 15 July 2014. On 1 September 2017, the compilation Soundtrack '97-'17 will be released to celebrate her 20 years of career.

On 14 January 2016, Elisa announced her ninth studio album, On, which was released on 25 March 2016. "No Hero" serves as the lead single off the album.

Elisa released her tenth studio album Diari aperti through Universal Music Group on 26 October 2018, which debuted at number two of FIMI Albums Chart. The album's lead single, "Se piovesse il tuo nome", peaked at number four on the FIMI Italian chart and at number one on the Italian Airplay Chart for nine weeks. In January 2019, Elisa released the second single, "Anche fragile", singing it at the Sanremo Music Festival 2019 as a special guest. In May, "Vivere tutte le vite" featuring rapper Carl Brave was released as the album's third single.

The singer has been chosen by Walt Disney Animation Studios for the dubbing of the animated film The Lion King premiering in Italy on 21 August 2019. Elisa voiced Nala, who is voiced by pop-star Beyoncé in the original, and sung the Italian version of "Spirit" and "Can You Feel the Love Tonight" with Marco Mengoni, who voiced Simba. In June 2019 she was featured on Imagine Dragons's song "Birds", the fifth single from their fourth album "Origins". The following 17 September she published the fifth single "Tua per sempre".

The singer announced that a double album Diari aperti (Segreti Svelati) would be released on 15 November 2019 with a total of 21 tracks stemming from the tenth album Diari Aperti and the English EP Secret Diaries . In the project has other collaborations with Carmen Consoli, Brunori Sas and Rkomi. The first single from the repack was Blu "Part II" released on 8 November 2019. The same day was published the album Note di viaggio – Capitolo 1: venite avanti... by Francesco Guccini and Mauro Pagani, in which the singer-songwriter reinterpreted the song "Auschwitz".

2020s 

On 6 March 2020, Marracash releases a new single "Neon – Le ali", from the album Persona, featuring Elisa. On 10 April 2020, Elisa published the collaboration "Andrà tutto bene" with Tommaso Paradiso, written during the quarantine due to the COVID-19 pandemic in Italy. On 20 November 2020, Luciano Ligabue published the collaboration with Elisa "Volente o nolente", second extraxt from his album 7.

In December 2021 Elisa performs the song "Alice!" title-track of the homonymous show "Alice!" written and directed by Simone Ferrari and Lulu Helbaek, composed by John Metcalfe, arranger for U2, Coldplay, Peter Gabriel and Blur.

In 2021, as well as announcing on social networks that she was working on her eleventh studio album, Elisa was featured on Mahmood's single "Rubini" from the rapper album Ghettolimpo. On 24 November 2021, the single "Seta" was published, anticipating the eleventh album, Ritorno al futuro/Back to the Future, which is scheduled for release in 2022. On 4 December 2021, it was officially announced Elisa participation in the Sanremo Music Festival 2022, with the song "O forse sei tu"., making it to the second place of the competition. 
She also participated in the following edition Sanremo Music Festival 2023, this time supporting her friend and colleague Giorgia Todrani performing a duet (a mash up of her own hit "Luce (Tramonti a nord est)" and Giorgia's hit "Di sole e d'azzurro".

Personal life 
Elisa and Andrea Rigonat (guitarist and band member) had their first child Emma Cecile on 22 October 2009. The second one, Sebastian, was born on 20 May 2013. They married in Grado on 5 September 2015.

Discography

Albums

Compilations

Live albums

Extended plays

Filmography

References

External links 
 

  

1977 births
Living people
People from Monfalcone
Musicians from Trieste
English-language singers from Italy
Italian rock singers
Italian women singer-songwriters
Italian singer-songwriters
Sanremo Music Festival winners
MTV Europe Music Award winners
Nastro d'Argento winners
21st-century Italian singers
21st-century Italian women singers